The 2005 Army Black Knights football team represented the United States Military Academy as an independent during the 2005 NCAA Division I-A football season.

Schedule

References

Army
Army Black Knights football seasons
Army Black Knights football